The Institute for the Study of the Ancient World (ISAW) is a center for advanced scholarly research and graduate education at New York University.  ISAW's mission is to cultivate comparative, connective investigations of the ancient world from the western Mediterranean to China. Areas of specialty among ISAW's faculty include the Greco-Roman world, the Ancient Near East, Egypt, Central Asia and the Silk Road, East Asian art and archaeology, Late Antiquity and the early Middle Ages, ancient science, and digital humanities.

ISAW was founded in 2006 with funding from the Leon Levy Foundation, established to continue the philanthropic legacy of Leon Levy, co-founder of the Oppenheimer mutual funds. Long interested in ancient history, Levy in his final years, along with his wife Shelby White, began discussions about the creation of a path-breaking institute where advanced scholars would explore trade and cultural links among ancient civilizations. After Levy's death in 2003, one of the earliest initiatives of the Leon Levy Foundation, was the fulfillment of that plan.  ISAW is a discrete entity within New York University, independent of any other school or department of the university, with its own endowment and its own board of trustees, and is housed in separate facilities in a historic six-story limestone on East 84th Street in Manhattan.

Governance, faculty, and staff

The director of ISAW is Alexander Jones (classicist). He succeeded the founding director Roger Bagnall in September, 2016. Jennifer Chi was the founding exhibitions director and chief curator, who guided the visual arts program until 2018.

As of September 1, 2021, the following individuals served as ISAW faculty:
 Lorenzo d'Alfonso
 Claire Bubb
 Roderick B. Campbell
 Sebastian Heath
 Robert G. Hoyland
 Alexander Jones
 Antonis Kotsonas
 Beate Pongratz-Leisten
 Daniel T. Potts
 Sören Stark
 Lillian Lan-ying Tseng

As of September 1, 2021, Senior Staff Members included:
 Diane Bennett (associate director for administration)
 Tom Elliott (associate director for digital programs and senior research scholar)
 Clare Fitzgerald (associate director for exhibitions and gallery curator)
 Marc LeBlanc (associate director for academic affairs)
 David M. Ratzan (head, ISAW Library)

ISAW's website describes its governance structure as follows:

Appointments and academic programs of the Institute for the Study of the Ancient World are under the jurisdiction of its faculty, which achieved independent status in fall, 2010, and which is led by the director. The director reports to the provost and president of New York University. In addition, the institute has its own Director's Council. Its chair is the institute's founder, Shelby White. The council plays a crucial role in ensuring that ISAW fulfills its mission and has the means necessary to do so. It provides essential advice to the director on strategic directions and public programming, and its members are vital ambassadors for ISAW in enlarging the public reached by its work.

Academic programs
ISAW's graduate program offers a PhD in the Study of the Ancient World.

ISAW offers hosts visiting research scholars conducting postdoctoral research. There are three types of appointment for visiting scholars:

 Visiting assistant professors, appointed for two years, during which they are expected to teach two undergraduate courses and one graduate seminar.
 Visiting research scholars, appointed for one year of research, funded in part or in whole by ISAW. These scholars may be at any point in their career from postdoctoral to retired.
 Externally funded scholars, who have the same responsibilities and privileges as the categories above, but do not receive financial support from ISAW.

Scholars in all three categories are expected to be in residence at ISAW for the duration of their appointment and to participate in the intellectual life of the community, including presenting a public lecture.

Exhibitions
In order to support its mission of communicating information about antiquity to the public, ISAW organizes public exhibitions. Past exhibitions include:

 Wine, Worship and Sacrifice: The Golden Graves of Ancient Vani (March 12 – June 1, 2008) 
 The Lost World of Old Europe: The Danube Valley, 5000 – 3500 BC (November 11, 2009 – April 25, 2010) 
 Before Pythagoras: The Culture of Old Babylonian Mathematics (November 12, 2010 – January 23, 2011) 
 Nubia: Ancient Kingdoms of Africa (March 11 – June 12, 2011)
 Edge of Empires: Pagans, Jews, and Christians at Roman Dura-Europos (September 23, 2011 – January 8, 2012)
 Nomads and Networks: The Ancient Art and Culture of Kazakhstan (March 7 – June 3, 2012)
 Echoes of the Past: The Buddhist Cave Temples of Xiangtangshan (September 11, 2012 – January 6, 2013)
 Temple and Tomb: Prehistoric Malta, 3600–2500 BCE (March 21 – July 7, 2013)
 Measuring and Mapping Space: Geographic Knowledge in Greco-Roman Antiquity (October 4, 2013 – January 5, 2014)
 Masters of Fire: Copper Age Art from Israel (February 13, 2014 – June 8, 2014)
 When the Greeks Ruled Egypt: From Alexander the Great to Cleopatra (October 8, 2014 – January 4, 2015)
 From Ancient to Modern: Archaeology and Aesthetics (February 12, 2015 – June 7, 2015)
 The Eye of the Shah: Qajar Court Photography and the Persian Past (October 22, 2015 – January 17, 2016)
 Designing Identity: The Power of Textiles in Late Antiquity (February 25 – May 22, 2016)
 Time and Cosmos in Greco-Roman Antiquity (October 19, 2016 – April 23, 2017)
 ...circle through New York (March 1 – August 31, 2017)
 Restoring the Minoans: Elizabeth Price and Sir Arthur Evans (October 5, 2017 – January 7, 2018)
 Romance and Reason: Islamic Transformations of the Classical Past (February 14, 2018 – May 13, 2018)
Devotion and Decadence: The Berthouville Treausure and Roman Luxury (October 17, 2018 – January 6, 2019)
 Encyclopedia of Society and Culture in the Ancient World
 History books pdf

Most exhibitions have been accompanied by illustrated catalogs, many of which are co-published by ISAW and Princeton University Press.

Library
ISAW houses a research library of approximately 40,000 non-circulating print volumes. The ISAW Library is a branch library of the NYU Division of Libraries, with facilities located on four floors of ISAW's facilities on East 84th Street. The library is open to members of the ISAW and NYU communities, as well as to scholars from other institutions who can demonstrate a need to access materials in the collection for their research.

Particular areas of strength in the ISAW Library's print collection include Greek and Roman material culture and history, Papyrology, Egyptology, Mesopotamian Archaeology and Assyriology, Central Asia and Iran, and Early China.

The library is engaged in providing access and support for new and emerging forms of digital scholarship, scholarly communication, and pedagogy in ancient studies. The library's digital initiatives include the Ancient World Digital Library (AWDL) and a joint project with ISAW Digital Programs to help catalog the online and open access resources.

Publications
ISAW has produced or sponsored both print and electronic publications related to the ancient world. These include:

 Jonathan Ben-Dov and Seth Sanders, eds. Ancient Jewish Sciences and the History of Knowledge in Second Temple Literature. NYU Press, 2014. 
 George Hatke. Aksum and Nubia: Warfare, Commerce, and Political Fictions in Ancient Northeast Africa. NYU Press, 2013. 
 David Wengrow. The Origins of Monsters: Image and Cognition in the First Age of Mechanical Reproduction. Princeton University Press, 2013. Based on the author's Rostovtzeff Lectures delivered at ISAW in 2011. 
 Roger S. Bagnall and Giovanni R. Ruffini. Amheida I: Ostraka from Trimithis 1. NYU Press, 2012. Also published in an open-access online version.  
 ISAW At Five, a book produced for ISAW's Five Year Celebration in May 2012.
 ISAW Papers, an open-content scholarly journal that publishes article-length works on any topic within the scope of ISAW's scholarly research.
 The Journal of Inner Asian Art and Archaeology
 ISAW Newsletter

References

External links
official website

New York University
2006 establishments in New York City
Research institutes in New York (state)
Archaeological research institutes
Art museums and galleries in Manhattan
University art museums and galleries in New York City